Myra Mayberry-Wilkinson (born 5 May 1965) is a Puerto Rican sprinter. She competed in the 100 metres at the 1992 Summer Olympics and the 1996 Summer Olympics.

References

1965 births
Living people
Athletes (track and field) at the 1992 Summer Olympics
Athletes (track and field) at the 1996 Summer Olympics
Puerto Rican female sprinters
Olympic track and field athletes of Puerto Rico
Place of birth missing (living people)